SŽ 342 is a series of single-system four-axle electric locomotives that make up the rolling stock of Slovenian Railways. Since it has "only" four axles compared to its six-axle contemporaries, the railwaymen somewhat mockingly called it a moped. As the locomotive proved to be one of the most reliable, the nickname "Tsar" became established for it.

In the years 1968-1970, 40 locomotives were delivered from Italy to haul passenger and light freight trains. Their service life is coming to an end and the fleet has roughly halved by now. In recent years, some locomotives were sold to the Italian regional railways Ferrovie Emilia-Romagna (FER) and Ferrovie Nord Milano (FNM), where they were renumbered to the E.640 series, some of them have already been scrapped, and the rest will most likely be withdrawn from traffic in a few years.

Drive 
The locomotive contains four electric motors (each motor on its own axis), which can be connected in parallel or in series, depending on the traction regime. Transmission on the driven axle is via a gear ratio of 25:76.

See Also 

 SŽ series 342 discussion thread
 SŽ series 342 commons gallery
 Ferrovie dello Stato Italiane electric locomotives

References 

Electric locomotives of Slovenia
Standard gauge locomotives of Slovenia
Bo′Bo′ locomotives
Standard gauge locomotives of Yugoslavia